Troots is an album by Scottish celtic fusion band Shooglenifty.  It was released on 20 January 2007 on the band's Shoogle Records label.

Track listing
 "McConnell's Rant" – 3:54
 "Excess Baggage" – 3:32
 "She's a Keeper/The Lead Break/The Trim Controller" – 6:14
 "Charlie And The Professor/The Tap Inn/The Dazzler" – 5:53
 "Laureen's Tune" – 3:01
 "Ful' Tae The Heid O' Troots/Ako Umram Il Zaginam/32 Bars of Filth" – 6:34
 "The Eccentric" – 4:41
 "The Patient Nurses/Wattle Grove/Another Bucket of Eels" – 5:50
 "Walter Douglas MBE" – 4:26
 "Jane's Dance" – 4:58

External links
 

Shooglenifty albums
2007 albums